Campelia can refer to:

 A genus that is now included as a taxonomic section within Tradescantia
 An orthographic variant of Campella, which is a synonym of Deschampsia